In 1994, the ruling Conservative Government of the United Kingdom brought forward plans to overhaul a number of aspects of local government in Scotland as part of the Local Government etc. (Scotland) Act 1994.  Part II of the Act reorganised Scotland's water supply and sewerage services, previously the responsibility of regional councils. Three water authorities were established: East of Scotland Water; West of Scotland Water; and North of Scotland Water. The main reason for this reorganisation was to prepare for the privatisation of water services, to bring Scotland into line with the rest of the UK. The water authorities in England and Wales had been privatised in 1989. However, public opinion was strongly against such a move, with successive polls showing 86% - 91% of people definitely opposed.

Referendum 
In March 1994 Strathclyde Regional Council held a postal referendum of Strathclyde residents on whether control of water and sewerage services should be privatised. Seven out of ten voters returned papers, a total of 1.2 million people, of whom 97% voted against privatisation.

Aftermath

With mounting disagreement with plans the policy was dropped, and the three Scottish Water Authorities were kept in public hands.  In 2002 all three were merged to create Scottish Water, a publicly owned water authority of the Scottish Government in the post-devolution era.

References

Referendums in Scotland
Political history of Scotland
1994 in Scotland
1994 Scottish local elections
Water privatization
1994 referendums
Privatisation referendums
Privatisation in the United Kingdom